Laser mask may refer to:

 Photomask, a lasering pattern mask used in laser etching and lithography
 Laser surgical mask, a mask worn by people during laser surgery

See also

 Laser (disambiguation)
 Mask (disambiguation)